Diane DiResta is an American speaker, author, media trainer, speech coach and certified speech pathologist based in New York City. DiResta has worked with celebrities and corporations to train them in communication skills.

Career
DiResta received a Masters of Science from Columbia University in Speech Pathology, and a B.A. in Speech from Brooklyn College. She received a certificate of clinical competence in speech-language pathology.

She started her career as a speech therapist at the NYC Board of Education and later started a consultancy company, DiResta Communications, Inc. that works with executives in Fortune 500 companies and celebrities to train them in communication skills. DiResta has also served as an adjunct lecturer at St Joseph's College and New York University. DiResta has also served as the president of National Speakers Association, New York City.

She has authored a book in 1998 on public speaking, Knockout Presentations: How to Deliver Your Message With Power, Punch, and Pizzazz, became a best seller on Amazon. The third edition of the book was published by Morgan James Publishing in September 2018. In 2015, DiResta received the Certified Speaking Professional (CSP) designation from the National Speakers Association.

DiResta has coached and trained executives in corporations including AT&T, Chase Manhattan Bank, Warner Brothers., the U.S. Army, the NBA, Merck, and IBM among others.

Publications
Give Fear the Boot: Kick Your Fear of Public Speaking (BookBaby eBook, 2014);
Knockout Presentations: How to Deliver Your Message With Power, Punch, and Pizzazz (Chandler House Press, 1998/2009);
Conversations on Success - Interview with David E. Wright (Insight Publishing Company, 2004);
"Voice Power: The Care and Feeding of the Professional Voice," Professional Speaker Magazine, May 2004.

References

External links
Official website

Year of birth missing (living people)
Living people
American women writers
Speech coaches
Brooklyn College alumni
21st-century American women